Dalton Schoen (born October 13, 1996) is a Canadian football wide receiver for the Winnipeg Blue Bombers of the Canadian Football League (CFL). He played college football at Kansas State. Schoen has also been a member of the Los Angeles Chargers, Kansas City Chiefs, and Washington Football Team.

College career
He was a walk-on with the Kansas State Wildcats, where he red-shirted in 2015 before becoming a starter from the 2016-2019 seasons. He finished his college career ranking seventh in Wildcats history in yards per completion and his 1,569 career receiving yards were good for 15th in school history.

Professional career

Los Angeles Chargers
On April 25, 2020, Schoen signed with the Los Angeles Chargers as an undrafted free agent. He was waived on September 4, 2020.

Kansas City Chiefs
On February 12, 2021, Schoen signed a reserve/future contract with the Kansas City Chiefs. He was waived on August 30, 2021.

Washington Football Team
On September 17, 2021, Schoen signed with the practice squad of the Washington Football Team. He was released off the practice squad eleven days later.

Kansas City Chiefs (II)
On December 23, 2021, Schoen signed with the practice squad of the Kansas City Chiefs. He was released off the practice squad six days later.

Winnipeg Blue Bombers
Schoen was signed by the Blue Bombers prior to the start of the 2022 CFL season. In the week five away game against the BC Lions, Schoen had his first 100 yard game and also his first two touchdown game as a professional. As a result he was named a top performer of the week by the CFL. Schoen continued his strong rookie season, he finished the season in the month of October and was named a top performer of the month with five touchdowns and 323 yards receiving. Schoen finished the season leading the league in receiving yards and receiving touchdowns, as a result he was the West Division's nominee for the league's Most Outstanding Rookie Award. On November 17, 2022, Schoen was declared the CFL's Most Outstanding Rookie for the 2022 Season. Following his rookie season in the CFL, Schoen had NFL workouts for the Minnesota Vikings, Arizona Cardinals, and Cincinnati Bengals.

Statistics

Personal life
While playing at Kansas State, Schoen completed a bachelor's degree in mechanical engineering before pursuing a master's in data analytics.

References

External links
Winnipeg Blue Bombers bio
cfl.ca bio

1996 births
Living people
American football wide receivers
Canadian football wide receivers
Los Angeles Chargers players
Kansas City Chiefs players
Kansas State Wildcats football players
Washington Football Team players
Winnipeg Blue Bombers players
Canadian Football League Rookie of the Year Award winners